Hazelwood Railway Station is a disused railway station on the Wirksworth branch of the Midland Railway. It served the village of Hazelwood.

History
The Midland Railway opened Hazelwood and other stations on the branch line to Wirksworth on 1 October 1867. The station was designed by the company architect John Holloway Sanders.

The London, Midland and Scottish Railway temporarily withdrew Wirksworth branch passenger services from 16 June 1947 due to post-war fuel shortages. British Railways made this closure permanent from May 1949 when the line was removed from the summer timetable. BR withdrew goods services from Hazelwood on 2 March 1964, but the branch remained in use for mineral freight until December 1989.

The station building and yard were sold and are now the premises of a timber yard and sawmill. The platform has been removed.

The line through the station is now operated as the heritage Ecclesbourne Valley Railway but there are no plans to reopen the station.

Stationmasters
Anthony Swift 1867 - 1890
H. Swift 1890 - 1929
G.W. Marple 1929 - 1931 (also station master at Shottle)
In 1931 Hazelwood station was placed under the direct supervision of the Duffield station master.

Spelling
The station was originally spelt Hazlewood in the 1867 Midland Railway timetable. The village itself was spelt Hazzlewood on an Ordnance Survey map of the time. It was subsequently spelt Hazelwood on timetables and station name boards. The OS changed to the current spelling around 1920.

Location
The Station is on Nether Lane north of the B5023 Wirksworth road, which is the main route from Duffield to Wirksworth and parallels the railway along the Ecclesbourne valley.

Route

References

External links
 Ecclesbourne Valley Railway official website
 Ecclesbourne Valley Railway Association official website
 
 

Disused railway stations in Derbyshire
Former Midland Railway stations
Railway stations in Great Britain opened in 1867
Railway stations in Great Britain closed in 1947
John Holloway Sanders railway stations